General elections were held in Nigeria on 23 February 2019 to elect the President, Vice President, House of Representatives and the Senate. The elections had initially been scheduled for 16 February, but the Electoral Commission postponed the vote by a week at 03:00 on the original polling day, citing logistical challenges in getting electoral materials to polling stations on time. In some places, the vote was delayed until 24 February due to electoral violence. Polling in some areas was subsequently delayed until 9 March, when voting was carried out alongside gubernatorial and state assembly elections.

The elections were the most expensive ever held in Nigeria, costing ₦69 billion (US$625 million) more than the 2015 elections.

Incumbent president Muhammadu Buhari won his reelection bid, defeating his closest rival Atiku Abubakar by over 3 million votes. He was issued a Certificate of Return, and was sworn in on 29 May 2019, the former date of Democracy Day.

Electoral system
The President of Nigeria is elected using a modified two round system, to be elected in the first round, a candidate must receive a majority of the vote and over 25% of the vote in at least 24 of the 36 states. If no candidate passes this threshold, a second round is held.

The 109 members of the Senate were elected from 109 single-seat constituencies (three in each state and one for the Federal Capital Territory) by first-past-the-post voting. The 360 members of the House of Representatives were also elected by first-past-the-post voting in single-member constituencies.

Presidential candidates

Party primaries

PDP
The People's Democratic Party held its presidential primaries on 5 October 2018, at the Adokiye Amiesimaka Stadium, Port Harcourt, Rivers State. Thirteen aspirants contested for the ticket of the PDP, with Atiku Abubakar emerging the winner.

APC
Though some party members aspired for office of the president, notably, Dr. SKC Ogbonnia, Chief Charles Udeogaranya, and Alhaji Mumakai-Unagha, the incumbent President Muhammadu Buhari was selected as the sole candidate of the All Progressives Congress party primaries held on 29 September 2018 amidst charges of imposition.

Other candidates

Chike Ukaegbu, founder of Startup52, is the presidential candidate of AAP.
Donald Duke, a former governor of Cross River State, is the presidential candidate of the SDP.
Fela Durotoye, motivational speaker and presidential candidate of Alliance for New Nigeria.
Oby Ezekwesili, former Minister of Education and leader of the Bring Back Our Girls campaign. She ended her campaign on January 24, 2019 to combine support with other candidates to support a bid against APC and PDP.
Tope Fasua, founder and National Chairman of the Abundant Nigeria Renewal Party.
Rabiu Kwankwaso, former governor of Kano State.
Sule Lamido, a former governor of Jigawa State.
Ahmed Makarfi, former chairman of the People's Democratic Party National Caretaker Committee.
Obadiah Mailafia, former Deputy Governor of the Central Bank of Nigeria and candidate of the African Democratic Congress.
Kingsley Moghalu, former Deputy Governor of the CBN and Professor of Practice at Tufts University's Fletcher School of Law and Diplomacy.
Gbenga Olawepo-Hashim, oil business mogul and presidential candidate for the Peoples Trust.
Remi Sonaiya, member of the KOWA Party and former university lecturer.
Omoyele Sowore, human rights activist, pro-democracy campaigner and publisher of news website Sahara Reporters.
Kabiru Tanimu Turaki, former Minister of Special Duties.

Presidential debates
A presidential and vice-presidential debate was organised by the Nigerian Elections Debate Group (NEDG) and the Broadcasting Organisations of Nigeria (BON), with invitations extended to five of the 78 presidential candidates. The Debate Group explained the exclusion of other candidates as a measure to ensure the effectiveness of the debate and not an endorsement of the candidates chosen.

The vice presidential debate was held on 14 December 2018, at the Transcorp Hilton Hotels in Abuja. All invited vice presidential candidates were present, with candidates discussing health, education, security, economy and foreign affairs policies plans.

The presidential debate occurred on 19 January 2019, and took place at the same venue. The two leading presidential contestants were absent, with Atiku Abubakar leaving the venue upon discovering that Muhammadu Buhari was absent. Fela Durotoye (ANN), Oby Ezekwesili (ACPN) and Kingsley Moghalu (YPN) continued the debate, while criticising the absence of the others. Mark Eddo moderated the debate.

Opinion polls

Conduct
Immediately following the elections there were claims of widespread fraud by the opposition. The claims included accusations of ballot box snatching, vote-trading and impersonation. There were also claims that caches of explosives were found by police. Losing candidate Atiku Abubakar filed a case in the Nigerian supreme court citing widespread irregularities in the polls . However the court dismissed his case, saying that Atiku has failed to prove widespread fraud committed by the electoral team of Buhari. The court also dismissed an allegation which said that Buhari lied about his academic background.

The African Union said the elections were "largely peaceful and conducive for the conducting of credible elections." The electoral commission also described the elections as mostly peaceful. On the contrary, US-based organisation Freedom House severely criticised the conduct, saying that they were marred by irregularities and intimidation.

Results

President
The results of the presidential election were announced in the early hours of 27 February 2019.

By state

Senate

Senate President Bukola Saraki (PDP) was defeated in Kwara Central by the APC candidate.

Currently, 64 incumbent Senators will not be returning as members of the Ninth Senate, having been defeated during the elections. While the APC will have a simple majority of votes in the Senate, it will not have a supermajority (74 votes), meaning it cannot push through constitutional amendments on its own. Three Senate seats have yet to be filled.

House of Representatives

Governors

On 2 March 2019, elections were held for governors of 29 of the 36 states of Nigeria. Elections were suspended on the original date in Rivers State. They were later held on April 3, where the INEC declared that incumbent Wike won re-election.

References

 
Presidential elections in Nigeria
Parliamentary elections in Nigeria
General
Nigeria
February 2019 events in Nigeria
Election and referendum articles with incomplete results